Hannah Rose Ware (born 8 December 1982) is an English actress, best known for her roles as Emma Kane in the Starz political drama series Boss (2011–2012) and as Sara Hanley in the ABC primetime soap opera Betrayal (2013–2014).

Life and career 

Ware was born in Hammersmith and raised in Clapham. She is the daughter of Helena (née Keell), a social worker, and John Ware, a former BBC Panorama reporter, who divorced when she was 12. She is the older sister of musician Jessie Ware. Her mother is Jewish, and both Ware and her sister were raised in the faith. She attended Alleyn's School in Dulwich, then studied acting at the Lee Strasberg Theatre and Film Institute in New York.

Ware appeared in the films Cop Out (2010) and Shame (2011). From 2011 to 2012, she played Emma Kane, the estranged addict daughter of Chicago mayor Tom Kane, in the Starz series Boss. In 2013, she was cast in ABC drama series Betrayal as lead character, and she appeared in Spike Lee's thriller film Oldboy. In 2015, Ware played the female lead, opposite Rupert Friend, in the action film Hitman: Agent 47.

Ware starred in the Hulu series The First in 2018, and played the leading role on the Netflix science fiction series The One in 2021.

Filmography

Film

Television

References

External links 
 

1982 births
Living people
English female models
English film actresses
English television actresses
21st-century English actresses
Actresses from London
People from Clapham
People from Hammersmith
People educated at Alleyn's School
Lee Strasberg Theatre and Film Institute alumni
Jewish English actresses